Patancheru Assembly constituency is a constituency of Telangana Legislative Assembly, India. It is one of 10 constituencies in Medak district. It is part of Medak Lok Sabha constituency. It is also one of the 24 constituencies of GHMC.

Gudem Mahipal Reddy of Telangana Rashtra Samithi won the seat in 2014 Assembly Election.

Mandals
The Assembly Constituency presently comprises the following Mandals:

Members of Legislative Assembly

Election results

Telangana Legislative Assembly election, 2018

Telangana Legislative Assembly election, 2014

Andhra Pradesh Legislative Assembly election, 2009

See also
 List of constituencies of Telangana Legislative Assembly

References

Assembly constituencies of Telangana
Medak district